Norway participated in the Eurovision Song Contest 2013 in Malmö, Sweden. The Norwegian entry was selected through the national selection "Melodi Grand Prix 2013", organised by the Norwegian broadcaster Norsk rikskringkasting (NRK). Margaret Berger represented Norway with the song "I Feed You My Love", which qualified from the second semi-final of the competition and placed 4th in the final with 191 points.

Before Eurovision

Melodi Grand Prix 2013 
Melodi Grand Prix 2013 was the 51st edition of the Norwegian national final Melodi Grand Prix and selected Norway's entry for the Eurovision Song Contest 2013. The competition consisted of three semi-finals and a final in different cities across Norway, hosted by Jenny Skavlan and Erik Solbakken, replacing Per Sundnes who stepped down as the host since 2007. Vivi Stenberg was assigned as the new music producer for the competition. The shows were televised on NRK1 as well as streamed online at NRK's official website nrk.no. The final was also broadcast online at the official Eurovision Song Contest website eurovision.tv.

Format 
The competition consisted of four shows: three semi-finals on 19 January, 26 January and 2 February 2013 and a final on 9 February 2013. Seven songs competed in each semi-final and the top three entries proceeded to the final. The results in the semi-finals were determined exclusively by public televoting. A jury panel also selected out of the remaining non-qualifying acts from the semi-finals a wildcard to proceed to the final. The results in the final were determined by public televoting and three regional juries.

Competing entries 
A submission period was opened by NRK between 1 July 2012 and 1 September 2012. Songwriters of any nationality were allowed to submit entries, while performers of the selected songs had to be at least 16 years old by the first semi-final for the Eurovision Song Contest 2013. NRK also reserved the right to choose the performers of the selected songs in consultation with the songwriters. At the close of the deadline, 600 submissions were received. Twenty-one songs were selected for the competition by a jury panel consisting of Vivi Stenberg (Melodi Grand Prix music producer), Kristin Winsents (NRK P2 radio host), Marie Komissar (NRK P3 radio host and music producer), Gisle Stokland (manager, owner and editor of the website 730.no) and Christine Dancke (DJ and booking manager at Blå). The competing acts and songs in each semi-final were revealed on 16 January, 23 January and 30 January 2013, respectively, during the new program MGP Direkte.

Schedule

Semi-finals
Three semi-finals took place on 19 January, 26 January, and 2 February 2013. In each semi-final seven songs competed and the top three entries were selected to proceed to the final. An additional jury wildcard was awarded to one of the eliminated acts, which also progressed to the final.

Final
Ten songs consisting of the nine semi-final qualifiers alongside the jury wildcard, Lucky Lips, competed during the final on 9 February 2013. The winner was selected over two rounds of voting. In the first round, the top four entries were selected by public televoting to proceed to the second round, the Gold Final. In the Gold Final, three regional juries from the three semi-final host cities awarded 1,000, 2,000, 3,000 and 4,000 points to their top four songs. The results of the public televote were then revealed by Norway's five regions and added to the jury scores, leading to the victory of "I Feed You My Love" performed by Margaret Berger with 102,032 votes. In addition to the performances of the competing entries, the interval acts featured performances of 2012 Norwegian Eurovision entrant Tooji and Eurovision Song Contest 2012 winner Loreen.

At Eurovision

To ensure fair ticket distribution in the semifinals, the Eurovision Reference Group decided on 7 November 2012 that Norway would compete in the second semifinal on 16 May. In the second semifinal, the producers of the show decided that Norway would perform 13th, following Hungary and preceding Albania. On stage, Margaret Berger was joined by drummer Axel Tidemann and three backing vocalists: May Kristin Kaspersen, Jorunn Hauge and Nicoline Berg Kaasin.

Norway qualified from the second semi-final, placing 3rd and scoring 120 points. At the second semi-final winners' press conference, Norway was allocated to perform in the second half of the final. In the final, the producers of the show decided that Norway would perform 24th, following Italy and preceding Georgia. Norway placed 4th in the final, scoring 191 points.

In Norway, the semi-finals and final were aired on NRK1, with commentary by Olav Viksmo-Slettan. In addition, NRK3 also aired an alternative broadcast of the final with commentary by the hosts of the P3morgen radio show on NRK P3, Ronny Brede Aase, Silje Therese Reiten Nordnes and Yngve Hustad Reite.

The national jury that provided 50% of the Norwegian vote in the second semi-final and the final consisted of: Suzanne Sumbundu, Henning Solvang, Martine Maribel Furulund, Simone Eriksrud and Harald Sommerstad. The Norwegian spokesperson in the grand final was 2012 entrant Tooji.

Voting

Points awarded to Norway

Points awarded by Norway

References

External links
Full national final on nrk.no

2013
Countries in the Eurovision Song Contest 2013
2013
Eurovision
Eurovision